Stade Gabèsien (basketball) is a Tunisian professional basketball team located in the city of Gabès. The team competes in the Championnat National A, the top tier national level.

Notable players

 El Hadji Ndiaye

References

External links
Presentation at Afrobasket.com

Basketball teams in Tunisia
Basketball teams established in 1957
Stade Gabèsien